The Haukeli Tunnel is a road tunnel in Ullensvang Municipality in Vestland county, Norway. This tunnel was the longest tunnel in Norway from 1968 until the Høyanger Tunnel was opened in 1982. In 2007, the tunnel was renovated and the interior height was increased to  throughout the tunnel.

The tunnel is part of the European route E134 highway, and this tunnel was built in 1968 to replace an older exposed road that was often impassable in the wintertime. This section goes between the two mountains at Dyrskar and it is encased in concrete with a ventilation tower attached. Dyrskar was a challenging place to pass when the road went there. The old road is still drivable during the summer months. At Dyrskar, one can also see one of the oldest tunnels in Norway: the Old Dyrskartunnel which was in use from 1900–1919. The old tunnel is located on the hillside west of the pass.

References

Ullensvang
Road tunnels in Vestland